Trąby ("Horns") is a Polish coat of arms. It was used by many szlachta (noble) families under the Kingdom of Poland and the Polish–Lithuanian Commonwealth.

History
The origin of the horn motif lies in the extent of lands conceded being determined by the distance a horn could be heard in all directions.

Blazon
Argent three bugle horns in triangle the mouthpieces conjoined in fess point Sable garnished, virolled and corded Or.

Notable bearers
Notable bearers of this coat of arms have included:
 Prince Jan Karaszewicz-Tokarzewski (1885–1954) — Ukrainian diplomat and heraldry historian
 Kristinas Astikas
 Radvila Astikas
 Zbigniew Brzeziński
 Teodor Narbutt, historian, military engineer
 Radziwiłł family
 Tadeusz Jordan-Rozwadowski, Austrian & Polish General & Politician, first chief of the modern Polish General Staff 1918-1919 & 1920-1924, major contributor to victory at the Battle of Warsaw, one of the founders of the modern Polish state.
 Michał Karaszewicz-Tokarzewski
 Mikołaj Trąba
 Russanowski Trąba 
 Rusianowski Trąba

Gallery

Variations

Cities and villages

Other

See also
 Polish heraldry
 Heraldic family
 List of Polish nobility coats of arms

External links

Bibliography
 Alfred Znamierowski: Herbarz rodowy. Warszawa: Świat Książki, 2004, s. 172. .
 Tadeusz Gajl: Herbarz polski od średniowiecza do XX wieku : ponad 4500 herbów szlacheckich 37 tysięcy nazwisk 55 tysięcy rodów. L&L, 2007, s. 406-539. .

References

Polish coats of arms
Belarusian coats of arms